Guggisberg (Bernese German Guggishbärg [ˈgʊkisbærg]) is a municipality in the Bern-Mittelland administrative district in the Swiss canton of Bern.

Guggisberg may also refer to:
 Guggisberg Cheese Company, developer of American Baby Swiss cheese

People with the surname
Gordon Guggisberg (1869–1930), British Brigadier-General, Sir, senior Canadian-born British Army officer
Gunvor Guggisberg (born 1974), Swiss singer and dancer known professionally simply as Gunvor
Ron Guggisberg (born 1973), US politician, Democratic member of the North Dakota House of Representatives